A gas heater is a space heater used to heat a room or outdoor area by burning natural gas, liquefied petroleum gas, propane or butane.

Indoor household gas heaters can be broadly categorized in one of two ways: flued or non-flued, or vented and unvented.

History 
The first gas heater made use of the same principles as the Bunsen burner. Beginning in 1881, the burner's flame was used to heat a structure made of asbestos, a design patented by Sigismund Leoni, a British engineer. Later, fire clay replaced the asbestos because it is easier to mould. Modern gas heaters still work this way, although they now use other refractory materials.

Function 
The gas heater is able to warm up a whole room by first allowing the flame to heat the air locally, then it disperses throughout the air by convection. Today the same principle applies with outdoor patio heaters or "mushroom heaters" which act as giant Bunsen burners.

Modern gas heaters have been further developed to include units which utilize radiant heat technology, rather than the principles of the Bunsen burner. This form of technology does not spread via convection, but rather, is absorbed by people and objects in its path. This form of heating is useful for outdoor heating, where it is more economical than using Air conditioning.

Flued heaters
Flued heaters are always permanently installed wherever they are placed. The flue, if properly installed with correct overall height, should extract most heater emissions. A correctly operating flued gas heater is typically safe for use.

Non-flued heaters

Non-flued heaters – also known as unvented heaters, vent-free heaters, or flueless fires, may be either permanently installed or portable, and sometimes incorporate a catalytic converter. Non-flued heaters can be risky if appropriate safety procedures are not followed. There must be adequate ventilation, they must be kept clean, and they should always be switched off before sleeping. If operating correctly, the main emissions of a non-flued gas heater are water vapour and carbon dioxide and nitrogen dioxide.

Operation
Home gas heating controls cycle using a mechanical or electronic thermostat.  Gas flow is actuated with a valve. Ignition is by electric filament or pilot light. Flames heat a radiator in the air duct but outside the flue, convection or a fan may distribute the heat.

See also 
 Gasoline heater
 Kerosene heater
 Fireplace

References

External links

Burners
Heaters
Heater

ja:ガスストーブ